The IES (Institute of Secondary Education) Andrés Laguna is a public educational center located in the city of Segovia, Castilla y León, Spain.

It originates from the Provincial Institute of Segovia, the oldest educational center in the province, founded for the first time in 1841, thus having been open for more than 180 years, and the educational center has a staff of 113 teachers and more than 1,100 registered students.

The school has a collection of fossils.

Notable teachers
 Antonio Machado, French teacher, vice-principal in 1927;
 Vicente Gaos González-Pola (1964);
 Consuelo Burell (1964);
 Carlos Sahagún (sección delegada en 1965).

References

External links

Cathedral
Secondary schools in Spain